Insomnio may refer to:
 Insomnio (Hamlet album), 1998
 Insomnio (Sol D'Menta album), 2001
 "Insomnio" (song), 2003, by Kumbia Kings

See also 
 Insomnia (disambiguation)